AMD Alliance International is a non-profit coalition of the world’s leading vision, seniors and research organizations working to raise awareness of age-related macular degeneration, understanding of available options for prevention, early detection, treatment, rehabilitation and support services.  It is the only international organization in the world that concentrates exclusively on age related macular degeneration, the leading cause of vision loss in the developed world.

Age-Related Macular Degeneration

AMD is an eye condition that
causes loss of central vision,
leaving only peripheral, or side,
vision intact. AMD is the leading
cause of visual impairment for people
over 50 in the Western world.

Types & Detection

Macular degeneration is often related to aging, thus the name age-related macular degeneration (AMD or ARMD).

The two most common forms of AMD are dry and wet.

Dry AMD
This more common form, causes varying degrees of  sight loss and is identified by the collection of yellow, fatty deposits called drusen in the macula the central part of the retina responsible  for clear central vision.

Wet AMD
Occurs less often (10-15 percent of cases), but the chance for severe sight loss is much greater. It is characterized by development of abnormal, leaky blood vessels in the macula. Scar tissue may form causing irreversible blind spots and in many cases leads to legal blindness.

AMD Alliance International Member Organizations

Argentina
 Fundación Oftalmológica Hugo Nano

Australia
 Macular Degeneration Foundation Australia
 Retina Australia
 Vision Australia Foundation

Austria
 EURAG: European Federation of Older Persons

Belgium
 Belgian Organization for the Prevention of Blindness

Brazil
 Retina Brasil

Canada
 CNIB
 Canadian Association of Optometrists
 Canadian Ophthalmological Society
 The Foundation Fighting Blindness-Canada
 International Federation on Ageing
 National Coalition on Vision Health

Finland
 Finnish Federation of the Visually Impaired

France
 Association Retina France

Germany
 Pro Retina Deutschland e.V.
 Berufsverband der Augenärzte Deutschlands
 DOG

Hong Kong
 Hong Kong Society for the Blind
 Retina Hong Kong

India
 LV Prasad Eye Institute
 National Society for the Prevention of Blindness - India

Ireland
 Fighting Blindness Ireland

Israel
 ESHEL: The Association for the Planning and
 International Federation on Ageing
 NAMAG – Association of AMD Patients in Israel

Italy
 International Agency for the Prevention of Blindness - Italian Branch
 Retina Italia Onlus
 Societá Italiana Retina

Netherlands
 Macula Degeneratie Vereniging

New Zealand
 Retina New Zealand
 The Royal New Zealand Foundation of the Blind

Poland
 Polish Association of the Blind

South Africa
 Retina South Africa

Spain
 Organización Nacional De Ciegos Españoles (ONCE)
 Spanish Vitreous and Retina Society

Switzerland
 Retina International
 Retina Suisse

Tunisia
 Nadi al Bassar, African Centre for Sight and Visual Sciences

United Kingdom
 Royal National Institute of Blind People
 Age Concern England
 Fight for Sight
 Macular Disease Society
 Wales Council for the Blind
 Dr. Bob Thompson, Honorary Life Chair

United States
 Alliance for Aging Research
 American Optometric Association
 American Optometric Association-Low Vision Section
 American Society of Ophthalmic Registered Nurses
 The Foundation Fighting Blindness, Inc.
 International Association for Audio Information Services
 Lighthouse International
 The Association for Macular Diseases
 Lions Clubs International
 Macular Degeneration Partnership
 Macular Degeneration Support (MD Support)
 Prevent Blindness America
 Hadley School for the Blind
 The Seniors Coalition
 Eye Care America

References

https://www.nlm.nih.gov/medlineplus/maculardegeneration.html

https://web.archive.org/web/20070420173233/http://www.lighthouse.org/aboutus/press/press-releases/pr-smoking/

https://web.archive.org/web/20080606095302/http://www.cnib.ca/en/news/archive/amd-news-092006.aspx

https://web.archive.org/web/20080916102223/http://www.nei.nih.gov/strategicplanning/np_part.asp
 Living Well With Macular Degeneration: Dr. Bruce Rosental and Kate Kelly. 
 Age-Related Macular Degeneration: Daniel L. Robert. 

International medical and health organizations
Ophthalmology organizations